Clarke Sydney Omondi Oduor (born 25 June 1999) is a Kenyan professional footballer who plays for League One club Barnsley, and the Kenya national team. He plays as a left back, however he has also played as an attacking midfielder and winger.

Career

Leeds United
Oduor started his career at Leeds United's academy, signing a professional contract on 16 January 2017.

He made his professional debut on 6 January 2019, coming on as an 85th-minute substitute during a 2–1 defeat to Queens Park Rangers in the third round of the FA Cup.

On 17 February, Oduor signed a new contract with Leeds, extending his deal until the end of the 2019–20 season with the option of a further year.

Oduor featured regularly for Carlos Corberán's Leeds United under-23 side over the course of the 2018–19 season, showing his versatility by playing as left back, left wing back, winger and as a forward over the course of the year. With Oduor's help, Leeds won the PDL Northern League championship as well as the national PDL championship, beating Birmingham City in the final.

Barnsley
On 31 August 2019, Oduor signed a four-year deal to join EFL Championship side Barnsley.

On 7 December, Oduor made his league debut for Barnsley as a 93rd-minute substitute in the Championship. On 14 December, Oduor made his first league start for the side. On 26 December, he earned Man of the Match honours in a league match against West Bromwich Albion. He scored his first goal in the 91st minute of the last game of the 2019–20 season against Brentford to keep Barnsley in the Championship.

On 1 September 2022, Oduor signed for Hartlepool United on loan. He scored his first goal Hartlepool in a 2–1 defeat to Swindon Town.

International career
Oduor was eligible for both the Kenyan national team and the England national team. He made his senior debut for Kenya in a 2–1 friendly win over Zambia on 9 October 2020.

Style of play
Oduor is known for his versatility, being able to play as a winger on either flank or as a left back, left wing-back or left-sided forward. With Oduor style known for his pace, incisive footwork and his ability to both defend and attack.

Career statistics

References 

1999 births
Living people
Footballers from Nairobi
Kenyan footballers
Kenya international footballers
Association football forwards
Leeds United F.C. players
Barnsley F.C. players
Kenyan expatriate footballers
Expatriate footballers in England
Kenyan expatriate sportspeople in England
Hartlepool United F.C. players